Granville Henry Lyons (July 16, 1908 – April 14, 1953) was an American Negro league first baseman between 1931 and 1942.

Early life and career
A native of Nashville, Tennessee, Lyons made his Negro leagues debut in 1931 with the Nashville Elite Giants. He went on to play for the Indianapolis ABCs, Philadelphia Stars, and Memphis Red Sox, and finished his career with the Baltimore Elite Giants in 1942. Lyons died in Nashville in 1953 at age 44.

References

Further reading
 Tennessean staff (July 29, 1945). "Black Crackers in Dell Friday". The Nashville Tennessean. p. 42

External links
 and Seamheads

1908 births
1953 deaths
Baltimore Elite Giants players
Indianapolis ABCs (1931–1933) players
Louisville Black Caps players
Memphis Red Sox players
Nashville Elite Giants players
Philadelphia Stars players
Baseball first basemen
Baseball players from Nashville, Tennessee
20th-century African-American sportspeople